Mads Larsen may refer to:
 Mads Larsen (boxer)
 Mads Larsen (footballer)
 Mads Mensah Larsen, Danish handball player